Sérgio Carnasciali (born 6 June 1964) is a Brazilian handball player. He competed in the men's tournament at the 1992 Summer Olympics.

References

1964 births
Living people
Brazilian male handball players
Olympic handball players of Brazil
Handball players at the 1992 Summer Olympics
Sportspeople from Curitiba